Deh-e Mir Qasem (also Romanized as Deh-e Mīr Qāsem; also known as Mīr Qāsem) is a village in Hendudur Rural District, Sarband District, Shazand County, Markazi Province, Iran. At the 2006 census, its population was 81, in 19 families.

References 

Populated places in Shazand County